William Zepeda Segura (born 4 June 1996) is a Mexican professional boxer who has held the WBA Continental Americas lightweight title since July 2021.

Professional career
Zepeda made his professional debut on 14 November 2015, scoring a third-round knockout (KO) victory against Alonso Salvatierra in Cabo San Lucas, Mexico.

After compiling a record of 11–0 (9 KOs), he defeated Juan Pablo Borbon via third-round corner retirement (RTD) on 25 October 2017, capturing the vacant WBF Mexican lightweight title in Metepec, Mexico. Following a technical knockout (TKO) victory in a non-title fight against Jesus Acosta in February 2018, Zepeda was scheduled to make the first defence of his title against Pedro Solís on 27 April in Culiacán, Mexico. Solís failed to weigh in below the lightweight limit at the pre-fight weigh-in, meaning he would be ineligible to contest for the title. The fight went ahead without the WBF championship at stake, and Zepeda emerged victorious via fifth-round TKO.

Following two more victories in non-title fights in the latter half of 2018–Ulises Perez via TKO in September and Maximiliano Galindo via KO in November–Zepeda won his second title on 2 March 2019, in Ciudad Acuña, Mexico, defeating Eliot Chavez via TKO in the tenth and final round to capture the vacant WBC FECARBOX Silver lightweight title. He successfully defended the title in his next fight, defeating José Rosales via TKO on 8 June in Toluca, Mexico.

After four stoppage victories in non-title fights, Zepeda faced undefeated prospect Hector Tanajara Jr. on 9 July 2021, at the Banc of California Stadium in Los Angeles, with the vacant WBA Continental Americas lightweight title on the line. Zepeda emerged victorious, capturing the vacant WBA regional title via sixth-round RTD after Tanajara's corner called a halt to the contest before the start of the seventh round. Zepeda made the first defense of his WBA title with a fourth-round knockout of John Vincent Moralde on November 13, 2021.

Professional boxing record

References

Living people
1996 births
People from San Mateo Atenco
Mexican male boxers
Lightweight boxers
Southpaw boxers
Boxers from the State of Mexico